Hypochra is a genus of picture-winged flies in the family Ulidiidae.

Species
 H. albipennis
 H. albufera
 H. asiatica
 H. atricornis

References

Ulidiidae